Gabriel I (? – after 1596) was Ecumenical Patriarch of Constantinople from March to August 1596. He was previously bishop of Thessaloniki.

References

Sources 
 Venance Grumel, Traité d'études byzantines, vol. I : La chronologie, Presses universitaires de France, Paris, 1958.
 Nicolas Viton de Saint-Allais, L'art de vérifier les dates, tome I, Paris, 1818, p. 494.

Bishops of Thessaloniki
16th-century Ecumenical Patriarchs of Constantinople